John Francis "Moe" Murphy (September 13, 1924 – January 29, 2003) was an American professional basketball and baseball player. Murphy was born in Philadelphia, Pennsylvania and attended Simon Gratz High School, where he led the Philadelphia Public League in points per game with 13.7 in 1942. He spent three seasons playing for the Wilmington Bombers of the American Basketball League (ABL) and briefly embarked on a baseball career with the Cincinnati Reds' Triple-A team. Murphy played for one season in the Basketball Association of America (BAA) with the Philadelphia Warriors and New York Knicks. He returned to the ABL for the 1947–48 season when he played for the Lancaster Roses. Murphy also played for the Philadelphia Sphas.

After his retirement from playing, he worked in the bakery of an Acme Markets store in Philadelphia.

BAA career statistics

Regular season

References

External links

1924 births
2003 deaths
American men's basketball players
Baseball players from Philadelphia
Forwards (basketball)
New York Knicks players
Philadelphia Warriors players
Basketball players from Philadelphia